The phrase NU football can refer to one of the following American football teams:

Nebraska Cornhuskers football
Northwestern Wildcats football